Terekly (Tiräkle) is a rural locality (a village) in Bakaldinsky Selsoviet, Arkhangelsky District, Bashkortostan, Russia. The population was 520 as of 2010. There are 12 streets.

Geography 
Terekly is located 13 km east of Arkhangelskoye (the district's administrative centre) by road. Kurgash is the nearest rural locality.

References 

Rural localities in Arkhangelsky District